The 2017–18 IP Superliga e Basketbollit is the 24th season of the Kosovo Basketball Superleague.

Teams

KB Borea Peja promoted to the league after winning 2016–17 Kosovo Basketball First League and replaced Vëllaznimi, that was relegated from the previous season.

Regular season

Playoffs
Playoffs were played in a best-of-five playoff format. The higher seeded teams played game 1, 2 and 5 at home in the semifinals and games 1, 3 and 5 in the finals.

References

External links
Official website of Kosovo Basketball Superleague 

Kosovo Basketball Superleague seasons
Kosovo
Basketball